George II (Giorgi II), of the Leonid dynasty was a king of Abkhazia from 923 to 957 AD. His lengthy reign is regarded as a zenith of cultural flowering and political power of his realm. Despite being independent and locally titled as a Mepe (king), he is also regarded as Exousiastes, the title that was addressed to him by Byzantines.

George II continued the expansionist policy of his predecessor, aiming primarily at unification of Georgia. It took him, however, some time to assume full ruling powers as his half-brother Bagrat also claimed the crown.

Life 

In 923, King Constantine III of Abkhazia died, and George, then George II Abkhazia succeeded him. However, Bagrat, George's youngest brother, also claimed the crown, the latter engineered a coup with the support of a party of nobles, most importantly his father-in-law, Gurgen II of Tao. The conflict lasted for nearly seven years and ended with the sudden death of Bagrat in 930. To secure the allegiance of the local nobility in central Georgia, George appointed his son Constantine as a duke/viceroy of Kartli in 923, but the latter too, revolted against him in 926. In response, George entered in Kartli and placed the rock-hewn city of Uplistsikhe under siege. He lured Constantine by treachery and had him blinded and castrated. In the same year, he installed another son, Leon (the future king Leon III), as a duke/viceroy of Kartli.

George II aided by the rebellious Kakhetian (Gardabanian clan) nobles proceeded to campaign against the Kvirike II, Prince-bishop of Kakheti. He succeeded in dispossessing Kvirike of his principality in the 930s. To secure his supremacy over Kartli, George allied himself with the Georgian Bagratids of Tao-Klarjeti, and gave his daughter, Gurandukht to Gurgen Bagrationi in marriage. Soon Kvirike returned to offensive and incited rebellion in Kartli. George sent a large army under his son, Leon, but the king died amid the expedition, and Leon had to make peace with Kvirike, ending his campaign inconclusively.

Cultural life 

George was also known as a promoter of Orthodox Christianity and a patron of Georgian Christian culture. He helped to establish Christianity as an official religion in Alania, winning the thanks of Constantinople. In the first half of the 10th century he founded Khopa (Gudauta district) and Kiachi (Ochamchire district) cathedrals, as well as Ckhondidi cathedral (Martvili district) to counter the Greek cathedrals, and, by virtue of this, new cathedrals were a mainstay of the central state-power against external and internal enemies.

Character 
The Georgian Chronicles describes him:
“He had all the virtues, courage and boldness; was faithful to God, was famous as the builder of the churches, merciful towards the poor, generous, modest, full of noble features and kind”.Quote from Byzantine patriarch Nicholas Mystikos's letter addressed to King George, written immediately after his accession on the throne.“...You (George), an intelligent, sensible man...”

18th century Georgian historian Vakhushti Bagrationi describes him:“George was the God-Fearing and pious king, stately, bold and courageous, merciful, generous, church builder, kind to orphans and widows”.

Family 
George married a certain Helen:

Issue 
 Constantine, Duke/Viceroy of Kartli (923–926);
 Leon III, Duke/Viceroy of Kartli (926–957); King of Abkhazia (960–969).
 Demetrius III, King of Abkhazia (969–976).
 Theodosius III, sent to Constantinople to be educated there; King of the Abkhazia (975–978).
 Bagrat, sent to Constantinople to be educated there;
 Anonymous daughter, married to Prince Shurta of Kakheti (Kvirike II's brother);
 Gurandukht, married to Prince Gurgen Bagrationi;
 Anonymous daughter, married to Abas I of Armenia.

Ancestry

Genealogy

See also

Divan of the Abkhazian Kings
History of Georgia

Notes

Sources 
 Marie-Félicité Brosset, Histoire de la Géorgie, et Additions IX, p. 175.
 Анчабадзе З. В., Из истории средневековой Абхазии (VI-XVII вв.), Сух., 1959;

References 

960 deaths
10th-century Kings of Abkhazia
10th-century monarchs of Georgia
Year of birth unknown